is a former Japanese footballer. He retired in 2018.

Career statistics

Club

Notes

References

1991 births
Living people
People from Tama, Tokyo
Sportspeople from Tokyo Metropolis
Association football people from Tokyo Metropolis
Meiji University alumni
Japanese footballers
Japanese expatriate footballers
Association football defenders
Tokyo Verdy players
Kapfenberger SV players
SC Ritzing players
Tokyo Musashino United FC players
2. Liga (Austria) players
Austrian Regionalliga players
Japan Football League players
Japanese expatriate sportspeople in Austria
Expatriate footballers in Austria